Joseph Robert John Sr. (born October 13, 1939) is a member of the North Carolina House of Representatives, having served since 2017. He is a former judge of the North Carolina Court of Appeals. He served on that court from 1992 until 2000. Previously, he had been a state superior court and state district court judge, based in Greensboro. He had also been a prosecutor and practiced at the firm of Pell, Pell, Weston & John.

Career

In 2010, Judge John was named interim director of the North Carolina State Bureau of Investigation crime lab by N.C. Attorney General Roy A. Cooper. He was named to the post on a permanent basis in 2011. John retired in 2014.

He was elected as a Democrat to the North Carolina House of Representatives, District 40, in 2016, defeating incumbent Rep. Marilyn Avila. In 2018, John was re-elected to a second term after defeating Avila in a rematch. John won a third term in 2020, defeating Republican challenger Gerald Falzon.

During his time in office, Joe John has focused on fully funding North Carolina schools, eliminating partisan gerrymandering, and fighting against what he calls the "War on an Independent Judiciary".

Electoral history

2022

2020

2018

2016

Committee assignments

2021-2022 session
Appropriations 
Appropriations - Justice and Public Safety 
Judiciary II 
Families, Children, and Aging Policy 
Transportation

2019-2020 session
Appropriations 
Appropriations - Justice and Public Safety
Judiciary 
Families, Children, and Aging Policy 
Transportation

2017-2018 session
Appropriations
Appropriations - Justice and Public Safety
Homeland Security, Military, and Veterans Affairs
Insurance
Judiciary II
State and Local Government II

References

External links

1939 births
Living people
People from East Chicago, Indiana
People from Raleigh, North Carolina
University of North Carolina at Chapel Hill alumni
University of North Carolina School of Law alumni
North Carolina lawyers
21st-century American politicians
Democratic Party members of the North Carolina House of Representatives
North Carolina Court of Appeals judges